The Surrey County Football Association was founded in 1877 and affiliated to The Football Association in 1882, at the same time as a County Senior Cup competition, the Surrey Senior Cup, was established.  The organisation administers all levels of men's, women's and junior football in the county of Surrey, as well as those parts of Greater London in historic Surrey lying more than 12 miles from Charing Cross.

County cups
These are the current county cups run by the Surrey FA.

 Saturday Senior Cup
 Saturday Premier Cup
 Saturday Intermediate Cup
 Saturday Junior Cup
 Saturday Lower Junior Cup
 Sunday Senior Cup
 Sunday Premier Cup
 Sunday Intermediate Cup
 Sunday Junior Cup
 Sunday Lower Junior Cup
 Mid-week Cup
 Sunday Veterans Cup
 Women's Cup
 U18s Youth Floodlit Mid-week Cup
 U18s Youth Cup
 U16s Youth Cup
 U15s Youth Cup
 U14s Youth Cup
 U13s Youth Cup
 U12s Youth Cup
 U16s Girls Youth Cup
 U15s Girls Youth Cup
 U14s Girls Youth Cup
 U13s Girls Youth Cup
 U12s Girls Youth Cup

Surrey Charity Shield
The Surrey Charity Shield was introduced in 1895–96 in England as the main prize given by the Surrey County Football Association.

Footnotes

External links

County football associations
Football in Surrey
1877 establishments in England
Sports organizations established in 1878